Willis T. Taylor (born December 9, 1955) is a former wide receiver in the National Football League. He was drafted in the ninth round of the 1978 NFL Draft by the Tampa Bay Buccaneers and was a member of the Green Bay Packers that season.

References

People from Montclair, New Jersey
Sportspeople from Essex County, New Jersey
Players of American football from New Jersey
Green Bay Packers players
American football wide receivers
Pittsburgh Panthers football players
1955 births
Living people